Waking may refer to:

Waking up, emerging from sleep
Waking (band), an alternative rock band
The Waking, a poem written by Theodore Roethke